Ernest J. Gallo (March 18, 1909March 6, 2007) was an American businessman and philanthropist. Gallo co-founded the E & J Gallo Winery in Modesto, California.

Early life 
Gallo was born on March 18, 1909, in Jackson, California.

Gallo's grandparents immigrated from Italy to the United States. Gallo's father was Giuseppe Gallo, a.k.a. Joseph Edward Gallo Sr, and his mother, Assunta Bianco Gallo, a.k.a. Susie Bianco Gallo. Together with his uncle Michael, his father ran the Gallo Wine Company, a wine distribution company. His mother's family, the Biancos, were winemakers. Gallo's father operated a boarding house for the miners in Jackson, California and a saloon in Oakland, California.

In 1910, at one year old, Gallo lived with his maternal grandparents, Batista Biancos, in Hanford, California. At about age 6, Gallo returned to live with his parents.

After the 1918 prohibition, Gallo's father had to close the saloon business. Gallo's father bought a 120-acre ranch in Antioch, California and became a farmer growing 30 acres of grapes. Gallo worked in cultivating in the farm. By age 12, Gallo's father sold the ranch in Antioch and moved to a small vineyard in Escalon, California.

In the 1920s, his parents purchased a 40-acre farm near Modesto, California. Gallo's family also bought a 20-acre farm near Keyes. Gallo's father sold their grapes in Chicago.

Gallo had two brothers, Julio Gallo (1910–1993), and Joseph Edward Gallo, Jr. (1919–2007).

On June 21, 1933, Gallo's father shot his mother and killed himself.

Gallo graduated from Modesto High School in Modesto, California.

Education 
Gallo attended Modesto Junior College, but he did not graduate.

Career
In 1926 at 17, Gallo worked for his father. Gallo harvested grapes and shipped them via railway to Chicago. By 18, Gallo was selling grapes in Chicago. During Gallo's travel from Chicago back to California, he met Giuseppe Franzia.

In 1933, shortly after the end of prohibition and the death of his parents, Gallo co-founded the E.&J. Gallo Winery, using $5,900 in borrowed cash from his mother-in-law. He became head of sales, marketing and distribution.

Philanthropy 
In 1955, Gallo created The Ernest Gallo Foundation.
In 2008, Gallo donated $800k(USD) to the University of Notre Dame, $600k(USD) to Stanford University, and $3.835 million (USD) to Lucile Packard Foundation for Children's Health. In 1980, Gallo also donated millions and created Ernest Gallo Clinic and Research Center  in Emeryville, California, at University of California, San Francisco.

Awards 
1989 Golden Plate Award of the American Academy of Achievement
 2003 Lifetime Achievement Award (given by Wine Enthusiast)

Personal life
In 1931, Gallo married Amelia Franzia (died 1993). They had two sons: David Gallo (died 1997), and Joseph Ernest Gallo, the CEO of the E&J Gallo Winery.

Gallo was ranked 297th on the 2006 Forbes 400 list of billionaires, with an estimated wealth of US$1.2 billion.

On March 6, 2007, Gallo died in Modesto, California, twelve days shy of his 98th birthday. Gallo is buried at St. Stanislaus Catholic Cemetery.

Further reading

References

External links
E. & J. Gallo Winery
Gallo Family Vineyards 
Ernest Gallo Clinic and Research Center
 Ernest Gallo: In his own words The Modesto Bee 
Excerpt of: Ernest_Gallo California Wine Industry Oral History Series, University of California
 Ernest Gallo at britannica.com
 Ernest Gallo, FRONTLINE, PBS

1909 births
2007 deaths
American people of Italian descent
People from Modesto, California
20th-century American businesspeople
Wine merchants
American billionaires
People from Jackson, California
Modesto Junior College alumni
James Beard Foundation Award winners
Gallo family
Burials in California